Haw Branch is a historic plantation house located near Amelia Courthouse, Amelia County, Virginia. The earliest section of the house dates to 1748. It was enlarged and expanded after the Revolutionary War. The house consists of a  five-bay central block with hipped roof and exterior-end chimneys, flanked by symmetrical three-bay wings with hipped roofs. It was restored in 1965. The house features finely detailed Federal-style interiors added about 1815. Also on the property are a contributing little school house, a rectangular building with a massive central chimney housing the kitchen and weaving room, and a smokehouse on the eastern end of the row of dependencies.

It was added to the National Register of Historic Places in 1973.

References

Plantation houses in Virginia
Houses on the National Register of Historic Places in Virginia
Federal architecture in Virginia
Houses completed in 1815
Houses in Amelia County, Virginia
National Register of Historic Places in Amelia County, Virginia